Jambi  is a Malayic language spoken in Jambi province, Indonesia. It is closely related to Palembang Malay in neighbouring South Sumatra, Riau Malay in Riau Province and the surrounding islands, and Bengkulu Malay in Bengkulu Province.

Phonology 
There are 25 native phonemes in Jambi Malay. These native phonemes consist of 19 consonants and 6 vowels.

Consonants

Notes 

  is pronounced as trill  at the end of a word.

Vowels

References

Yanti; Tadmor, Uri; Cole, Peter; Hermon, Gabriella. 2015. Critò Kitò: A collection of Jambi stories in the Seberang Dialect. Jakarta: Masyarakat Linguistik Indonesia [Indonesian Linguistic Society].  [Includes word list.]
Żaneta Krulikowska, Nadra Nadra, & Muhammad Yusdi. (2020). Phonological Sketch of Malay Jambi Language of Sarolangun, Indonesia. Arbitrer, 7(2), 173–181. https://doi.org/10.25077/ar.7.2.173-181.2020

External links
Traditional Jambi Malay

Agglutinative languages
Malay language
Languages of Indonesia
Malay dialects

Malayic languages